Eyraud-Crempse-Maurens is a commune in the Dordogne department in Nouvelle-Aquitaine in southwestern France. It was established on 1 January 2019 by merger of the former communes of Maurens (the seat), Laveyssière, Saint-Jean-d'Eyraud and Saint-Julien-de-Crempse.

See also
Communes of the Dordogne department

References

Communes of Dordogne